Core or cores may refer to:

Science and technology
 Core (anatomy), everything except the appendages
 Core (manufacturing), used in casting and molding
 Core (optical fiber), the signal-carrying portion of an optical fiber
 Core, the central part of a fruit
 Hydrophobic core, the interior zone of a protein
 Nuclear reactor core, a portion containing the fuel components
 Pit (nuclear weapon) or core, the fissile material in a nuclear weapon
 Semiconductor intellectual property core (IP core), is a unit of design in ASIC/FPGA electronics and IC manufacturing
 Atomic core, an atom with no valence electrons

Geology and astrophysics
 Core sample, in Earth science, a sample obtained by coring
 Ice core
 Core, the central part of a galaxy; see Mass deficit
 Core (anticline), the central part of an anticline or syncline
 Planetary core, the center of a planet
 Earth's inner core
 Earth's outer core
 Stellar core, the region of a star where nuclear fusion takes place
 Solar core,

Computing
 Core Animation, a data visualization API used in macOS
 Core dump, the recorded state of a running program
 Intel Core, a family of single-core and multi-core 32-bit and 64-bit CPUs released by Intel
 Magnetic core, in electricity and electronics, ferromagnetic material around which wires are wound
 Magnetic-core memory, the primary memory technology used before semiconductor memory
 Central processing unit (CPU), called a core
 Multi-core processor, a microprocessor with multiple CPUs on one integrated circuit chip
 Server Core, a minimalist Microsoft Windows Server installation option

Mathematics
 Core (game theory), the collection of stable allocations that no coalition can improve upon
 Core (graph theory), the homomorphically minimal subgraph of a graph
 Core (group theory), an object in group theory
 Core of a triangulated category
 Core, an essential domain of a closed operator; see Unbounded operator
 Core, a radial kernel of a subset of a vector space; see Algebraic interior

Arts, entertainment and media
 Core (novel), a 1993 science fiction novel by Paul Preuss
 Core (radio station), a defunct digital radio station in the United Kingdom
 90.3 The Core RLC-WVPH, a radio station in Piscataway, New Jersey, US
 C.O.R.E. (video game), a 2009 NDS game
 Core (video game), a video game with integrated game creation system
 "CORE", an area in the Underground in the video game Undertale
 "The Core", an episode of The Transformers cartoon

Film and television
 Cores (film), a 2012 film
 The Core, a 2003 science fiction film
 The Core, the 2006–2007 name for the programming block on Five currently known as Shake!

Music
 Core (band), a stoner rock band
 Core (Stone Temple Pilots album), 1992
 Core (Persefone album), 2006
  "Core", a song by Susumu Hirasawa from Paranoia Agent Original Soundtrack
 "The Core", a song from Eric Clapton's 1977 album Slowhand
 "CORE", a track from the soundtrack of the 2015 video game Undertale by Toby Fox

Organizations
 Core International, a defunct American computer and technology corporation
 Core Design, a videogame developer best known for the Tomb Raider series
 Coordenadoria de Recursos Especiais, Brazilian state police SWAT team
 Digestive Disorders Foundation, working name Core
 Center for Operations Research and Econometrics at the Université catholique de Louvain in Belgium
 Central Organisation for Railway Electrification, an organization in India
 China Open Resources for Education, an OpenCourseWare organization in China
 Congress of Racial Equality, United States civil rights organization
 CORE (research service), a UK-based aggregator of open access content 
 C.O.R.E., a computer animation studio
 CORE System Trust, see CORE-OM

Places

United States
 Core, San Diego, a neighborhood in California
 Core, West Virginia
 Core Banks, North Carolina
 Core Sound, North Carolina

Other places
 Corés, a parish in Spain
 The Core Shopping Centre (Calgary), Alberta, Canada 
 The Core, a shopping centre in Leeds, England, on the site of Schofields

People
 Earl Lemley Core (1902–1984), West Virginia botanist
 Ericson Core, American director and cinematographer

Other uses
 Core (architecture)
 Co-ordinated On-line Record of Electors, central database in the United Kingdom
 Coree or Cores, a Native American tribe
 Korah, a biblical figure
 Leadership core, concept in Chinese politics
 Persephone, a Greek goddess also known as Kore or Cora (Greek κόρη = daughter)
 Core countries, in dependency theory, an industrialized country on which peripheral countries depend
 Core curriculum, in education, an essential part of the curriculum
 Lithic core, in archaeology, a stone artifact left over from toolmaking
 CORE (Clinical Outcomes in Routine Use) System, see CORE-OM

See also
 CORE (disambiguation)
 Corre (disambiguation)
 Corps (disambiguation)
 Corium (disambiguation)
 Nucleus (disambiguation)